Bradlee Baladez (born August 8, 1991) is an American professional soccer player who currently plays for the Dallas Sidekicks in the Major Arena Soccer League.

Career

Early career
Born in Mesquite, Texas, Baladez is an alumnus of both Mesquite High School and the University of South Carolina. While in high-school, Baladez played with the varsity soccer team and was voted team MVP. He was also a part of the FC Dallas Academy that advanced to the 2009 and 2010 U.S. Soccer Development Academy finals. Baladez then started to attend USC where he played for the South Carolina Gamecocks soccer team for three seasons and was named the team offensive MVP after his second season.

FC Dallas
Baladez signed with FC Dallas of Major League Soccer as a homegrown player on December 19, 2012. Baladez is the eighth homegrown signing ever by the club. He made his debut for Dallas on July 20, 2013 in a league match against Montreal Impact at Saputo Stadium as substitute in the 63rd minute as Dallas drew the match 0–0.

Fort Lauderdale Strikers (loan)
Baladez was loaned  to Fort Lauderdale Strikers of the North American Soccer League on August 2, 2013 for the remainder of the 2013 season. He then made his debut for the Strikers on August 10 as a 71st-minute substitute in a 3–1 against Minnesota United at Lockhart Stadium. Baladez scored his first professional goal for the Strikers in the 34th minute match against the Atlanta Silverbacks on August 24 that resulted in a 1–0 victory. He scored his second goal on October 5 against rivals Tampa Bay Rowdies, netting the game-winning goal in the 84th minute after coming on as a substitute in the 2–1 win. Two weeks later Baladez scored a brace in the Strikers 6–2 win against the Silverbacks on October 19.

Personal life
He has been studying as part of the Carolina Degree Completion program.

Career statistics

References

External links
 FC Dallas Profile

1991 births
Living people
American soccer players
South Carolina Gamecocks men's soccer players
FC Dallas players
Fort Lauderdale Strikers players
Phoenix Rising FC players
North Carolina FC players
Association football forwards
People from Mesquite, Texas
Soccer players from Texas
Major League Soccer players
North American Soccer League players
USL Championship players
Sportspeople from the Dallas–Fort Worth metroplex
Major Arena Soccer League players
Homegrown Players (MLS)
Dallas Sidekicks (2012–present) players